Utayqah or Utaiqah is a residential neighborhood and a subject of Baladiyah al-Batha in southern Riyadh, Saudi Arabia. Bordered by al-Yamamah neighborhood to the east and King Fahd Road to the west, it is one of the oldest neighborhoods of Riyadh.

References 

Neighbourhoods in Riyadh